Necropolis is the eighth studio album by the Polish death metal band Vader. The album was released on 21 August 2009 by Nuclear Blast. The album was nominated for a Fryderyk Award in the category 'Heavy Metal Album of the Year (Album roku heavy metal)'. On 8 April 2009, Vader released the first part of their studio report for the album. Subsequently, the second part was released on 22 April, and the third part was released on 27 May.

Necropolis was recorded between March and April 2009 at Hertz Studio in Białystok, Poland, and was produced by Tue Madsen. Mixing and mastering for the album took place at Antfarm Studio in Denmark by Madsen, except the songs "The Seal" and "Summoning the Futura", which were mixed at VooDoo Gates Studio in Olsztyn, Poland. Necropolis is the first Vader release that features drummer Paweł "Paul" Jaroszewicz. A video was shot for the song "Never Say My Name", which is based partially on the book "The Gospel According To Satan" by Patrick Graham. Piotr "Peter" Wiwczarek talked about working on the set for videoclip, saying:

The album sold around 1,130 copies in the United States in its first week of release, according to Nielsen SoundScan. The album reached number 19 on the Billboard Top New Artist Albums (Heatseekers). In Poland, Necropolis landed at position No. 5, and dropped out five weeks later. The album also charted in France and Germany.

Track listing

Personnel
Production and performance credits are adapted from the album liner notes.

"We Are the Horde"

"We Are the Horde" is the seventh single by the Polish death metal band Vader. It was released on 1 September 2009 by Nuclear Blast.

The single was also released on 7" picture disc as split with American death metal band Nile.

Track listing

Charts

Release history

References

Vader (band) albums
2009 albums
Nuclear Blast albums

es:Necropolis (álbum)